Craig Anderson is an Australian director and actor best known for his comedic turns in the Australian television series' Double the Fist, Review with Myles Barlow, Laid, and award-winning short films Life in a Datsun, Demon Datsun, and Life in a Volkswagen. He directed the horror feature film Red Christmas.

Anderson has a First Class Honors in Performance and Theory from the University of Western Sydney and has almost completed a PhD on which looks at various Epistemologies of Comedy. In 2000, Anderson began a successful career as an MC and judge at film festivals including the Newcastle Film Festival, the Shootout Film Festival held annually in Newcastle, and the Funny Bone 500.

In November 2008 Anderson featured in three episodes of the ABC TV show Review With Myles Barlow. Double the Fist co-star Bryan Moses also featured in three episodes of the series. In addition Anderson served as associate producer and first assistant director on the series 

In 2013, Anderson was the subject of a six-part Observational Documentary series Next Stop Hollywood, which followed him around Hollywood during pilot series. In 2014, he shared directing duties on Australia's first Indigenous sketch Comedy series Black Comedy. In 2014 he (and fellow director Bec Cole) were nominated for an AACTA award for Best Direction in TV.

Filmography
Life in a Datsun (short 1999)
Life in a Volkswagen (short 2000)
Bootmen (2000)
Double the Fist (TV series 2004–2008)
Miscast (short 2010)
Charity Hurts (video 2010)
Review with Myles Barlow (TV series 2008–2010)
Laid (TV series 2011)
Bernie (Web series 2011)
Late Night Angel Weenie Baby (Web series 2011)
Dating Emergency 101 (Web series 2011)
Next Stop Hollywood (Documentary 2013)
The Moodys (TV series 2014)
Black Comedy (TV series 2014)
Maximum Choppage (TV Series 2015)
Miso Hungry (Documentary 2015)

References

External links 
 
 
 Craig Anderson on The Grave Plot Podcast

Australian male television actors
Living people
Place of birth missing (living people)
Year of birth missing (living people)
Western Sydney University alumni